Events from the year 1563 in Sweden

Incumbents
 Monarch – Eric XIV

Events

 
 7 June  – The King's brother Duke John and his spouse is accused of treason in their absence. 
 9 August – Northern Seven Years' War
 August – A fleet conquer the province and Duchy of Finland from the King's brother John on the order of the king. 
 12 August – Duke John and his spouse is arrested for treason after the siege of Turku, and imprisoned at Gripsholm Castle.
 22 August – Danish occupation of Älvsborg. 
 9 November – Danish victory at the Battle of Mared
 30 December – Swedish commander Nils Persson are given the order to invade and pillage the Danish province of Blekinge. 
 – Erik XIV encourage the peasantry of Norway to rebel against Denmark.

Births

Deaths

References

 
Years of the 16th century in Sweden
Sweden